Chah Mish (also Romanized as Chāh Mīsh) is a village in Golestan Rural District, in the Central District of Sirjan County, Kerman Province, Iran. At the 2006 census, its population was 49, in 9 families.

References 

Populated places in Sirjan County